Elias MRT station is a future underground Mass Rapid Transit station on the Cross Island line (CRL) located in Pasir Ris, Singapore.

This station will be part of a future extension between the Pasir Ris and Punggol stations on the Cross Island line. Elias MRT station will be situated at the junction of Pasir Ris Drive 10 and Pasir Ris Drive 3, around the military training area that will be cleared by 2022.

History
On 10 March 2020, LTA announced that Elias station would be part of the proposed Cross Island line (CRL). The station will be constructed as part of Punggol extension, consisting of four stations between Pasir Ris and Punggol, and was expected to be completed in 2031. However, the restrictions imposed on construction works due to the COVID-19 pandemic has led to delays and the dates were pushed by one year to 2032.

The contract for the design and construction of Elias station and associated tunnels was awarded on 30 January 2023 to a joint venture between CES_SDC Pte. Ltd. (formerly Sembcorp Design and Construction Pte Ltd.) and Chip Eng Seng Contractors Pte Ltd for S$562 million (US$ million). Construction will start in the 2nd quarter of 2023 with an expected completion date of 2032.

References

Proposed railway stations in Singapore
Mass Rapid Transit (Singapore) stations
Railway stations scheduled to open in 2032